Al Bilad is a Saudi Arabian daily newspaper located in Jeddah.

History
Al Bilad is the first daily newspaper in Saudi Arabia, founded by Mohammad Saleh Nasif on 3 April 1932 under the name Sawt al-Hijaz (Voice of Hijaz). Then on 3 April 1946 it became Al Bilad Al Saudia, and on 26 January 1959 the paper merged with Arafat newspaper and was renamed as Al Bilad Daily.

Ghalib Hamza Abulfaraj, a Saudi businessman, served as the editor-in-chief of the paper.

See also
List of newspapers in Saudi Arabia

References

External links
 Al Bilad website 
(in English)

1932 establishments in Saudi Arabia
Arabic-language newspapers
Mass media in Jeddah
Newspapers published in Saudi Arabia
Publications established in 1932